Jan Jansz. Buesem or Besem or Beusemen (1599/1600 – 1649) was a Dutch Golden Age painter.

He was a pupil of Pieter Jansz Quast around 1630. He is known for genre works, church interiors, and still life paintings.

References

1600s births
1649 deaths
Dutch Golden Age painters
Dutch male painters
Painters from Amsterdam